Superfetation (also spelled superfoetation – see fetus) is the simultaneous occurrence of more than one stage of developing offspring in the same animal.

In mammals, it manifests as the formation of an embryo from a different menstrual cycle while another embryo or fetus is already present in the uterus. When two separate instances of fertilisation occur during the same menstrual cycle, it is known as superfecundation.

Humans
While proposed cases of superfetation have been reported in humans, the existence of this phenomenon in humans has been deemed unlikely. Better explanations include differential growth between twins due to various reasons such as twin-to-twin transfusion syndrome. Artificially induced superfetation has been demonstrated, although only up to a short period after insemination.

A 2008 French study found evidence to suggest that superfetation is a reality for humans, but that it is so rare that there have been fewer than 10 recorded cases in the world.

In 2017, it was reported that an American woman who had agreed to act as a surrogate for a Chinese couple bore two babies initially believed to be twins. Before the adoptive parents could return home to China, however, it was discovered that one of the babies was, in fact, the biological son of the surrogate. Doctors confirmed that the birth-mother had become pregnant with her and her partner's child roughly three weeks after becoming pregnant with the Chinese couple's child.

There have been multiple cases reported to local US doctors with a week or less difference in age of twins and women who report two surges of ovulation occurring within a few days of each other. Though rare, this condition is believed to affect as many as 0.3% of women but often one twin is lost so the true numbers are not known. Research has found 10% of women released two eggs in a cycle, but both at the end of the same "wave" of follicullogenesis, which does not support the theory of superfetation in humans.

In September 2020, a woman in Wiltshire, England, gave birth to fraternal twins who were conceived three weeks apart.

Other animals
Superfetation is normal for some species of poeciliid fish and has been clearly demonstrated for the European brown hare.

In domestic cats, superfecundation is common but superfetation never has been definitively proven to occur. 

Animals that have been claimed to be subject to superfetation include rodents (mice and rats), rabbits, horses, sheep, marsupials (kangaroos and sugar gliders), felines, and primates (humans).

References

External links
 Superfetation in Beef Cattle Doctoral Thesis; Joel Andrew Carter, Louisiana State University, Defended 2002-03-18
 Superfetation in fish

Multiple births